Quem may refer to:
 Quem people, a historic ethnic group of Texas and Mexico
 Quem language, their language
 Quem (magazine), a Brazilian magazine published by Editora Globo

See also 
 
 KWEM (disambiguation)